This is a list of the 72 Members of Parliament (MPs) elected to the House of Commons of the United Kingdom by Scottish constituencies for the Fiftieth parliament of the United Kingdom (1987 to 1992) at the 1987 United Kingdom general election.

Composition at election

Composition at dissolusion

List

By-elections 

 1988 Glasgow Govan By-election, Jim Sillars, SNP
 1989 Glasgow Central By-election, Mike Watson, Labour
 1990 Paisley North By-election, Irene Adams, Labour
 1990 Paisley South By-election, Gordon McMaster, Labour
1991 Kincardine and Deeside By-election, Nicol Stephen, Scottish Liberal Democrat

See also 

 Lists of MPs for constituencies in Scotland

Lists of UK MPs 1987–1992
Lists of MPs for constituencies in Scotland
1987 United Kingdom general election